{{Infobox football club season
| club               = Bayern Munich
| image              =
| image_size         = 
| caption            = Bayern Munich players celebrate winning the UEFA Champions League
| season             = 2019–20
| ownertitle         = President
| owner              = Uli Hoeneß(until 15 November)Herbert Hainer(from 15 November)
| chairman           = Karl-Heinz Rummenigge
| manager            = Niko Kovač(until 3 November)Hansi Flick(permanent from 3 April)
| stadium            = Allianz Arena
| league             = Bundesliga
| league result      = 1st
| cup1               = DFB-Pokal
| cup1 result        = Winners
| cup2               = DFL-Supercup
| cup2 result        = Runners Up| cup3               = UEFA Champions League
| cup3 result        = Winners| league topscorer   = Robert Lewandowski (34)
| season topscorer   = Robert Lewandowski (55)
| highest attendance = 
| lowest attendance  = 
| average attendance = 
| largest win        =6–0  vs. 1899 Hoffenheim
6–0  vs. Red Star Belgrade
8–2  vs. Barcelona
| largest loss       =1–5  vs. Eintracht Frankfurt
| pattern_la1        = _bayern1920h
| pattern_b1         = _bayern1920H
| pattern_ra1        = _bayern1920h
| pattern_sh1        = _bayern1920h
| pattern_so1        = _3_stripes_red
| leftarm1           = D50000
| body1              = D50000
| rightarm1          = D50000
| shorts1            = D50000
| socks1             = D50000
| pattern_la2        = _bayern1920a
| pattern_b2         = _fcbm1920a
| pattern_ra2        = _bayern1920a
| pattern_sh2        = _fcbm1920a
| pattern_so2        = _bayern1920a
| leftarm2           = FFFFFF
| body2              = FFFFFF
| rightarm2          = FFFFFF
| shorts2            = CCCCCC
| socks2             = E5E5E5
| pattern_la3        = _bayern1920t
| pattern_b3         = _fcbm1920t
| pattern_ra3        = _bayern1920t
| pattern_sh3        = _bayern1920t
| pattern_so3        = _bayern1920t
| leftarm3           = 000833
| body3              = 000833
| rightarm3          = 000833
| shorts3            = 000833
| socks3             = 000833
| prevseason         = 2018–19
| nextseason         = 2020–21
}}

The 2019–20 FC Bayern Munich season''' was the 121st season in the football club's history and 55th consecutive and overall season in the top flight of German football, the Bundesliga, having been promoted from the Regionalliga in 1965. Bayern Munich also participated in this season's edition of the domestic cup, the DFB-Pokal, and the premier continental cup competition, the UEFA Champions League. As a result of winning the prior season's Bundesliga and DFB-Pokal, they also participated in this season's German super cup, the DFL-Supercup.

This was the 15th season for Bayern in the Allianz Arena, located in Munich, Bavaria, Germany. Bayern Munich became only the second European club to win the continental treble twice and ended the season undefeated in 30 consecutive matches in all competitions with 29 wins (including a record-breaking 8–2 Champions League victory against Barcelona) and one draw.

As a result of winning this season's Bundesliga and DFB-Pokal, they qualified for next season's DFL-Supercup, which they went on to win. Additionally, as a result of winning this season's UEFA Champions League, they qualified for both the UEFA Super Cup as well as the FIFA Club World Cup for next season and went on to win both of those competitions as well. Collectively, winning all six competitions available in the 2020 calendar year, namely the 2019-2020 season's Bundesliga, DFB-Pokal, and UEFA Champions League followed by the 2020-2021 season's DFL-Supercup, UEFA Super Cup, and FIFA Club World Cup was a feat known as the "sextuple" and this was one of only two times the feat had been accomplished in the history of European football.

The season was the first since 2006–07 without Franck Ribéry, who departed for Fiorentina in the summer, and the first since 2008–09 without Dutchman Arjen Robben, who initially retired after the 2018–19 season.

Squad information

Transfers

In

Out

Friendly matches

Competitions

Overview

Bundesliga

League table

Results summary

Results by round

Matches
The Bundesliga schedule was announced on 28 June 2019.

DFB-Pokal

DFL-Supercup

UEFA Champions League

Group stage

Knockout phase

Statistics

Appearances and goals

|-
! colspan=16 style=background:#dcdcdc; text-align:center| Goalkeepers

|-
! colspan=16 style=background:#dcdcdc; text-align:center| Defenders

|-
! colspan=16 style=background:#dcdcdc; text-align:center| Midfielders

|-
! colspan=16 style=background:#dcdcdc; text-align:center| Forwards

|-
! colspan=16 style=background:#dcdcdc; text-align:center| Players transferred out during the season

|-

Goalscorers

References

FC Bayern Munich seasons
Munich, Bayern
Bayern Munich
German football championship-winning seasons
UEFA Champions League-winning seasons
21